Vincent Mayers (19 March 1934 – 5 December 2013) was a Guyanese cricketer. He played six first-class matches for British Guiana between 1964 and 1969.

References

External links
 

1934 births
2013 deaths
Guyanese cricketers
Guyana cricketers